The coat of arms of Moncton is the municipal symbol of Moncton, New Brunswick, Canada. It is on the city's flag, as well.

Design

Supporters
The supporters of this coat of arms are: a blacksmith on the left, and a farmer on the right.

Shield
The shield consists of: a beehive and wheat on the upper half, a locomotive on the lower left, and the Petitcodiac tidal bore on the lower right.

Motto
The motto Resurgo means I rise again.

History

External links
 Coat of Arms

Provincial symbols of New Brunswick
Moncton